Born to Be is the singer Melanie's debut album, released on Buddah Records in 1968.

Following Melanie's success at the Woodstock Festival in 1969 Buddha repackaged and reissued the album as My First Album.

Track listing
All songs written by Melanie Safka except where noted.
 "In the Hour"
 "I'm Back in Town"
 "Bobo's Party"
 "Mr. Tambourine Man" (Bob Dylan)
 "Momma, Momma"
 "I Really Loved Harold"
 "Animal Crackers"
 "Christopher Robin Is Saying His Prayers"
 "Close to It All"
 "Merry Christmas"

Personnel
Melanie - guitar, vocals
 Roger Kellaway – arranger
Technical
 Peter Schekeryk – producer
 Bruce Staple – engineer
Artie Ripp - director

References

1968 debut albums
Melanie (singer) albums
Buddah Records albums